Luiaondo is a village and council in the municipality of Ayala, in Álava, Basque Country, Spain.

Geography 
Luiaondo is 25 km from Bilbao and 45 km from Vitoria, accessible by road, rail, and bus. The village contains the Luiaondo station on the C-3 line of Cercanías Bilbao. It also has an urban transport service. Luiaondo has services such as a restaurant, bars, grocery stores, a tobacco store, a covered fronton, and a bowling alley.

History 
The Malato Tree was formerly found in the village which marked the limits of the Lordship of Biscay and is the tree that appears on the Biscay coat of arms. In the 18th century, a stone cross was erected in the place where the tree was supposedly found.

Populated places in Álava